Hexisopus is a genus of hexisopodid camel spiders, first described by Ferdinand Karsch in 1879.

Species 
, the World Solifugae Catalog accepts the following fifteen species:

 Hexisopus abnormis (Roewer, 1932) — Angola
 Hexisopus aureopilosus Lawrence, 1968 — Namibia
 Hexisopus crassus Purcell, 1899 — South Africa
 Hexisopus eberlanzi (Roewer, 1941) — Namibia
 Hexisopus fodiens Simon, 1888 — Botswana
 Hexisopus fumosus Lawrence, 1967 — Namibia
 Hexisopus infuscatus Kraepelin, 1899 — Namibia
 Hexisopus lanatus (C.L. Koch, 1842) — Namibia, South Africa
 Hexisopus moiseli Lamoral, 1972 — Namibia
 Hexisopus nigrolunatus Kraepelin, 1899 — Namibia
 Hexisopus nigroplagiatus Lawrence, 1972 — Namibia
 Hexisopus psammophilus Wharton, 1981 — Namibia
 Hexisopus pusillus Lawrence, 1962 — Namibia
 Hexisopus reticulatus Purcell, 1902 — South Africa
 Hexisopus swarti Lawrence, 1968 — Namibia

References 

Arachnid genera
Solifugae
Taxa named by Ferdinand Karsch